13 x 13 was a Catalan TV series which aired in TV3. It described some adaptations of Catalan literature. 13 episodes were aired between 1987 and 1988.

Cast
 Francesc Orella
 Muntsa Alcañiz
 Carme Contreras
 Ángels Aymar
 Josep Maria Doménech

References

1987 Spanish television series debuts
1988 Spanish television series endings
1980s Spanish drama television series
Catalan television programmes